A sill swarm or sill complex in geology is a major group of sills intruded within continental crust. They are located under volcanic edifices, including flood basalt provinces and large lava plateaus. The volume of sill swarms can be similar to dike swarms.

Examples
 Chatsworth sill swarm, Victoria, Australia
 Loch Scridain Basalt-Rhyolite Sill Swarm, Mull, Scotland
 Morel sills, near Coronation Gulf, Nunavut, Canada
Rio Perdido sill swarm, Mato Grosso do Sul, Brazil
 Sariwon Sill Swarm, China
 Sill swarm in the Nahuel Niyeu Formation of Patagonia, Argentina

References

Volcanology
Sills (geology)